Glendale is an unincorporated community in Franklin County, in the U.S. state of Idaho.

History
A post office called Glendale was established in 1895, and remained in operation until 1904. The community's name is suggestive of topography of the area.

Glendale's population was 30 in 1960.

References

Unincorporated communities in Franklin County, Idaho